The James D. Gill Health & Physical Education Building, commonly known as Gill Gymnasium, is a 3,200-seat on-campus gymnasium and field house on the campus of Norfolk State University in Norfolk, Virginia. It was built in 1960 to serve as a field house for neighboring Dick Price Stadium as well as being home to the Norfolk State Spartans men's basketball team. The men's and women's teams both called the gym home until the opening of Joseph G. Echols Memorial Hall at the far end of Dick Price Stadium in 1982.  The building still serves as a field house and core building of the athletics training facilities on campus, and the women's volleyball team still uses the arena as its primary competition venue.

References

Sports venues in Norfolk, Virginia
1960 establishments in Virginia
Sports venues completed in 1960
Basketball venues in Virginia
College volleyball venues in the United States
Defunct college basketball venues in the United States